Vinjeøra is a village in the municipality of Heim, in the Trøndelag county of Norway.

Historically, Vinjeøra was the administrative centre of the old municipality of Vinje, which became a part of Hemne municipality in 1964.

The Fjordruta hiking trail is operated by KNT, and has a number of hikes that are accessible from Vinjeøra, including Storlisetra, Sollia, and Storfiskhytta. The mountain Ruten, the highest peak in Hemne, stands southeast of the village. The Vinje Church is located in the village of Vinjeøra.

References

Villages in Trøndelag
Heim, Norway